The 2019–20 Vanderbilt Commodores women's basketball team represented Vanderbilt University during the 2019–20 NCAA Division I women's basketball season. The Commodores, led by fourth-year head coach Stephanie White, played their home games at Memorial Gymnasium and competed as members of the Southeastern Conference (SEC).

Preseason

SEC media poll
The SEC media poll was released on October 15, 2019.

Schedule

|-
!colspan=9 style=| Non-conference regular season

|-
!colspan=9 style=| SEC regular season

|-
!colspan=9 style=| SEC Tournament

References

Vanderbilt Commodores women's basketball seasons
Vanderbilt
Vanderbilt Commodores women's
Vanderbilt Commodores women's